Raffaele Alcibiade (born 23 May 1990) is an Italian professional footballer who plays as a defender for  club Sangiuliano.

Club career

Juventus
Alcibiade began his career with Italian and European powerhouse Juventus. He started out in youth ranks of the Torino-based squad and was eventually promoted to the Primavera squad in 2008. Upon his promotion to the Juventus first team, Alcibiade was sent out on loan to Serie B side Pescara. During his loan with the Serie B club, Alcibiade made just 3 league appearances in his 5-month spell, and the loan was subsequently terminated by Juventus in January 2011. After returning to Juventus, Alcibiade was again sent on loan, this time to Lega Pro Prima Divisione side Gubbio, where he played more frequently, making 9 first team appearances, 4 as a starter. 30 In June 2011, Alcibiade returned to Juventus. Soon after his return, Alcibiade was bought by newly promoted Serie B side A.S.G. Nocerina.

On 18 July 2011, he joined Nocerina in co-ownership deal, who were looking to bolster their squad following promotion from the Serie C1 to the second tier of Italian football, Serie B. Alcibiade made 9 Serie B appearances before returning to Juventus on 22 June 2012 in 2-year contract, following Nocerina's relegation back to the Lega Pro Prima Divisione. Alcibiade joined Carrarese Calcio on 30 August 2012, on a season long loan deal. After 13 league appearances for the Lega Pro side, the defender returned to Juventus once more in January 2013, in order to be re-loaned out to Hungarian Nemzeti Bajnokság I side, Budapest Honvéd. At Honvéd, Alcibiade teamed up with former Juventus youth teammate, Davide Lanzafame, who is on a similar loan deal from Serie A rivals, Calcio Catania

Hungary
On 30 June 2013, Alcibiade officially completed a permanent transfer from Juventus to the Hungarian side following the expiration of his loan deal.

On 20 January 2015, Alcibiade was signed by Hungarian League club Szombathelyi Haladás.

Return to Italy
On 17 February 2016 he returned to Italy for U.S. Lecce. In summer 2016 he was signed by Paganese Calcio 1926.

Juventus U23 
In August 2019, Alcibiade returned to Juventus to play for Juventus U23 on a contract for the rest of the season. Alcibiade's contract was not extended at the end of the season. However, he signed a new contract with the club in September 2019.

Fidelis Andria
On 21 September 2021, he joined Fidelis Andria.

International career
Alcibiade has represented Italy at Italy U-20. He has six appearances for the U-20 team. He also played twice for Italy national under-21 B team, plus an unofficial match against Italy U20 in December 2011.

Career statistics

Club

Honours 
Juventus U23
 Coppa Italia Serie C: 2019–20

Gubbio
 Lega Pro Prima Divisione: 2010–11 (Group A)

References

External links
 FIGC 
 

1989 births
Living people
Footballers from Turin
Italian footballers
Association football defenders
Serie B players
Serie C players
Juventus F.C. players
Delfino Pescara 1936 players
A.S. Gubbio 1910 players
A.S.G. Nocerina players
Carrarese Calcio players
U.S. Lecce players
Paganese Calcio 1926 players
FeralpiSalò players
F.C. Pro Vercelli 1892 players
Juventus Next Gen players
S.S. Fidelis Andria 1928 players
F.C. Sangiuliano City players
Nemzeti Bajnokság I players
Budapest Honvéd FC players
Szombathelyi Haladás footballers
Italian expatriate footballers
Expatriate footballers in Hungary
Italian expatriate sportspeople in Hungary
Italy youth international footballers